Gow Fields is a politician and the former mayor of Lakeland, Florida; he is the first African American to be elected to this office.  Elected in 2009, he completed his term in January 2014. Together with service as a city commissioner, he had served more than 21 and half years on the commission. Fields was elected after a runoff election, succeeding mayor Buddy Fletcher. Fields served as a Lakeland City Commissioner since May 1992.

As mayor, Fields was involved in discussions about building high-speed rail connections between Orlando and Tampa. Fields was named as one of the defendants in a suit brought by atheists objecting to public prayer and city meetings. The suit was dismissed. During his tenure, Lakeland Linder International Airport began offering direct flights with Direct Air. Fields has also been involved in discussions over proposals to split off University of South Florida Polytechnic from the University of South Florida.

Mayor Fields also served on the Florida League of Mayors Board of Directors, including a term as the board president from August 2012 to August 2013. He is serving as the Advisor to the Florida Business Watch Board of Directors.

See also
 List of mayors of Lakeland, Florida

References

Year of birth missing (living people)
Living people
Mayors of places in Florida
People from Lakeland, Florida
African-American mayors in Florida